This is a list of professional wrestling awards.

List

Generally recognized

From wrestling companies

Independent organizations

Press

See also
 List of professional wrestling halls of fame
 Lists of awards

References

 
Lists of sports awards
Awards